Ívar Bjarklind (born 17 December 1974) is a retired Icelandic football midfielder.

References

1974 births
Living people
Ivar Bjarklind
Ivar Bjarklind
Ivar Bjarklind
Ivar Bjarklind
Association football midfielders
Ivar Bjarklind
Ivar Bjarklind